Bijan Azizi is an Iranian football manager who managed in the Canadian Professional Soccer League, and the Iran Pro League.

Career 
Azizi managed the York Region Shooters of the Canadian Professional Soccer League in 2000. In 2011, he served as an assistant coach under Ali Asghar Modir Roosta for Shahrdari Tabriz F.C. in the Iran Pro League. After the firing of Modir Roosta, he was elevated to the position of head coach under an interim basis. After the relegation of Shahrdari to the Azadegan League he resigned from his position.

References 

Iranian football managers
Canadian Soccer League (1998–present) managers
Living people
Year of birth missing (living people)